Organization and Methods is a historical term in management science. Divisions of Organization and Methods were charged with devising and managing large scale administrative procedures. The term is notable in that it was the large O & M organizations in areas such as insurance and government which pioneered the commercial use of electronic computers in what became Data Processing, later Information Systems and Information Technology.

References

Organization
Management science